Alaqua Cox (born February 14, 1997) is a deaf Native American actress. She landed her breakthrough role as Maya Lopez / Echo within the Marvel Cinematic Universe in the Disney+ series Hawkeye (2021) and as the protagonist in the upcoming spin-off series Echo (2023).

Early life
Cox was born Deaf to Elena and Bill Cox. She was born and raised in the Menominee Indian Reservation in Keshena, Wisconsin, and is of the Menominee and Mohican nation. She has three siblings: Will, Jordan, and Katie. She attended the Wisconsin School for the Deaf, where she played on the girls' basketball team from 2014 to 2015 and on the volleyball team.

Cox is an amputee with a prosthetic leg. She has not publicly revealed what led to her need for a prosthetic.

Career 
She was cast in Hawkeye as Echo, her debut acting role, on December 3, 2020.  Deaf activist Nyle DiMarco and many others applauded the casting. In June 2021, Echo co-creator David W. Mack reacted to the news of the Echo television series by expressing gratitude to Cox for being a representative for deaf and indigenous youth: "I taught at the School for the Deaf in Africa, Asia, [and] Europe, in my work for the U.S. State Department, [and] the students love Echo [and] will be happy about this."

Cox was on the red carpet for Marvel's Hawkeye premiere. "It's just so crazy that I'm getting my own show after Hawkeye. That was like my first acting role, ever," Cox told a reporter from Variety. "I don't know why they're giving me this opportunity, but I'm just grateful. I'm excited for the support and being able to advocate for the Deaf community. We want to have that equality and get more people involved. I'm just so grateful for all of the opportunities I've been given."  Cox told Disney's D23 magazine that Jeremy Renner and Hailee Steinfeld both worked to learn some American Sign Language so that they could communicate more easily with her. "I thought it was sweet of them putting in efforts to learn basic ASL to communicate with me. It means a lot to me as a Deaf person."

Filmography

Television

References

External links

1997 births
21st-century American actresses
21st-century Native American women
21st-century Native Americans
American amputees
American deaf actresses
Amputee actors
Living people
Native American actresses
Native American people from Wisconsin
People from Menominee, Wisconsin
Menominee people